Paulding County High School is a public secondary school located in Paulding County, Georgia, United States. The school was established in 1969 and is the oldest high school still in operation in Paulding County. It was established to help end segregation issues in the county.

Location 
Paulding County High School is located at 1297 Villa Rica Highway (Georgia State Route 61), about two miles south of downtown Dallas. It is one of only a few schools located on an old battlefield; it was built on the site of the Battle of Dallas in 1864 during the Atlanta Campaign.

Programs 

Paulding County High School has multiple academic and athletic programs.

Magnet program 
The Magnet Program (officially called the Academy of Science, Research, and Medicine) is a program with an accelerated curriculum available to any upcoming freshman in Paulding County, even if the student is districted for another high school. 60 freshmen who apply for the program are accepted every year. Despite the acceptance from any school in the county, most of the attending students are districted for Paulding County High School and would have attended the school if not accepted into the magnet program. The Academy opened during the 2012-2013 school year.

Band and chorus 
The school's marching band (The Pride of Paulding) had 103 members for the 2016-2017 year. During the spring concert season, the Paulding County High School Concert Band competes in the Georgia Music Educators Association's (GMEA) and Large Group Performance Evaluation (LGPE). The band was recently awarded all Superior ratings. During concert season, the Concert Band produces four performances: a fall concert occurring in late October to early November, one winter holiday concert (a joint affair with the school's chorus), one pre-LGPE concert, and another end-of-the school year spring concert.

The chorus produces four concerts every year: a fall concert, a winter holiday concert (jointly with the school's band), a pre-LGPE performance, and an end-of-the-year spring concert. The chorus also attends an LGPE during the spring. All concerts produced by the fine arts music department are free to attend.

Athletics 
The Paulding County High School Athletics Programs include soccer, basketball, football, softball, volleyball, track, swimming, tennis, cheer, baseball, wrestling, golf, cross country, raiders, and woman hunting

References 

https://web.archive.org/web/20130706104934/http://www.paulding.k12.ga.us/school_home.aspx?schoolid=4

External links 

1969 establishments in Georgia (U.S. state)
Educational institutions established in 1969
Public high schools in Georgia (U.S. state)
Schools in Paulding County, Georgia